Tursko Małe-Kolonia  (till December 31, 2000 as at Kolonia Tursko Małe with type of settlement as of colony independent) is a colony in the administrative district of Gmina Połaniec, within Staszów County, Świętokrzyskie Voivodeship, in south-central Poland.

The village has a population of  165.

Demography 
According to the 2002 Poland census, there were 147 people residing in Tursko Małe-Kolonia village, of whom 51.7% were male and 48.3% were female. In the village, the population was spread out, with 23.1% under the age of 18, 36.7% from 18 to 44, 24.5% from 45 to 64, and 15.6% who were 65 years of age or older.
 Figure 1. Population pyramid of village in 2002 — by age group and sex

References

Villages in Staszów County